Zatima is an American comedy drama television series created by Tyler Perry as a spin-off of Sistas. It premiered on BET+ on September 22, 2022.

Plot
In this spin-off from Sistas, Zac and Fatima start their new journey as a couple but a series of secrets, lies, infidelity, and exes threaten the pair's newfound love.

Cast and characters

Main
Devale Ellis as Zachary "Zac" Taylor
Crystal Renee Hayslett as Fatima Wilson
Nzinga Imani as Angela
Remington Hoffman as Bryce
Cameron Fuller as Nathan

Recurring
Jasmin Brown as Deja
Guyviaud Joseph as Tony
Danielle LaRoach as Belinda

Episodes

Series overview

Season 1 (2022)

Season 2

Production

Development
The series was picked up by BET+ on March 10, 2022. On August 26, 2022, it was announced that the series will premiere on September 29, 2022. It was later rescheduled to September 22, 2022, a week before. On February 17, 2023, a second season was ordered and announced and is set to premiere on March 16, 2023.

Casting
The main cast was revealed on August 26, 2022.

References

External links

2020s American black television series
2020s American comedy-drama television series
2022 American television series debuts
American television spin-offs
BET+ original programming
English-language television shows
Television series by Tyler Perry Studios
Television series created by Tyler Perry